Dr. James Cocke served as mayor of Williamsburg, Virginia from 1767 to 1768 and again from 1772 to 1773.

Mayors of Williamsburg, Virginia